Pygmy opossum may refer to:

 Chacoan pygmy opossum (Chacodelphys formosa) from South America
 Pygmy short-tailed opossum (Monodelphis kunsi) from South America

See also
 Pygmy possum, five living species of small marsupial in the family Burramyidae, from Australia and New Guinea

Animal common name disambiguation pages